Dialium corbisieri is a species of flowering plant, a medium to large tree in the family Fabaceae, subfamily Dialioideae.

The trees grow in flooded forest or on dry ground, on swamp- and stream sides, reaching 35 m in height with a bole up to 100 cm in diameter. which occurs in Congo-Brazzaville and Congo-Kinshasa, Gabon, Cabinda and Northern Angola.

Uses

Wood 
Its heavy, pinkish-brown wood, with a density of about 1020 kg/m³ at 12% moisture content, is very hard and can be used for the same purposes as Dialium aubrevillei. The wood is locally used as firewood and for charcoal production, but it can also been used for construction.

Fruit 
The fruits are used in traditional medicine.

References 

corbisieri
Flora of Angola
Flora of Gabon
Flora of the Republic of the Congo
Flora of the Democratic Republic of the Congo